Quezon City's 2nd congressional district is one of the six congressional districts of the Philippines in Quezon City. It has been represented in the House of Representatives of the Philippines since 1987. The district consists of the eastern barangays bordering Marikina, San Mateo and Rodriguez. From 1987 to 2013, it is the most populous district in the country, encompassing the northern part of Quezon City commonly called as Novaliches, until it was redistricted in time for the 2013 election. Just like its pre-2013 composition, it still includes the Batasang Pambansa, the seat of the House of Representatives. It is currently represented in the 19th Congress by Ralph Wendel Tulfo, of the Nacionalista Party (NP).

This district is the home of the Batasang Pambansa Complex, the seat of the House of Representatives.

Representation history

Election results

2010

2013

2016

2019

2022

See also
Legislative districts of Quezon City

References

Congressional districts of the Philippines
Politics of Quezon City
1987 establishments in the Philippines
Congressional districts of Metro Manila
Constituencies established in 1987